The First Prayut cabinet, formally known as the 61st Council of Ministers (คณะรัฐมนตรีไทย คณะที่ 61), was formed on 30 August 2014. General Prayut Chan-o-cha, the coup leader against then Prime Minister Yingluck Shinawatra's caretaker government and later appointed as leader of the National Council for Peace and Order, was elected as prime minister on 21 August 2014 and received the appointment from the royal command on 24 August 2014.

Lists of Ministers

Disclosure of interest

2014 asset disclosures
In October 2014 Thailand's National Counter-Corruption Commission (NCCC) made public the assets of the prime minister and his cabinet. One-third of the ministers are worth more than 100 million baht.

The prime minister declared 128 million baht (US$4 million) in net assets and 645,754 baht (US$19,676) in debts. Deputy Prime Minister Pridiyathon Devakula, the wealthiest cabinet member, declared 1,378 million baht (US$42 million) in assets with no debt. Next is Panadda Diskul, who runs the Office of the Prime Minister, who declared 1,315 million baht (US$40 million) in assets and no debt. The least wealthy cabinet member is Education Minister Narong Pipatanasai with 6.95 million baht (US$211,696) in assets and 2.92 million baht (US$88,000) in debt.

See also 
 National Council for Peace and Order
 Second Prayut cabinet

References 

 
c
2010s in Thailand
Cabinets of Thailand
2014 establishments in Thailand
2019 disestablishments in Thailand
Cabinets established in 2014
Cabinets disestablished in 2019
 
Monarchism in Thailand